The Mullah spiny mouse (Acomys mullah) is a species of rodent in the family Muridae found in Djibouti, Eritrea, Ethiopia, and Somalia. Its natural habitats are subtropical or tropical dry shrubland and rocky areas.

References

Acomys
Rodents of Africa
Mammals of Djibouti
Mammals of Eritrea
Mammals of Ethiopia
Mammals of Somalia
Mammals described in 1904
Taxa named by Oldfield Thomas
Taxonomy articles created by Polbot